Centreville Athletic Club of Bayonne, New Jersey was a U.S. soccer team which competed in the National Association Football League, winning two championships.

History
In April 1895, the Centreville A.C. joined the newly establish National Association Football League (NAFBL), a professional soccer league encompassing northern New Jersey and New York City. The team had been in existence previously as a recreational club. The first season in the NAFBL went well for Centreville as it took the title. However, the records for the league's second season have not been fully reconstructed and the final standings are unknown. The onset of a major recession combined with the Spanish–American War led to a suspension of the league in 1899.

Year-by-year

Honors
League Championship
 Winner (2): 1895, 1897

External links
 National Association Football League standings

References

Defunct soccer clubs in New Jersey
National Association Football League teams
Sports in Hudson County, New Jersey
Association football clubs established in the 19th century